Golzar (formerly, Deh Tazian (Persian: ده تازیان) also Romanized as Deh Tāzīān, Deh-e Tāzīān, and Deh Tāzeyān; also simply, Tāzīān; also formerly known as Karīāl ul ‘Arab, Qariāt al Arab, Qarīya-tol-’Arab, Qaryat ol ‘Arab, Qaryatol ‘Arab) is a city in the Central District of Bardsir County, Kerman Province, Iran.  At the 2006 census, its population was 6,131, in 1,164 families.

References

Populated places in Bardsir County

Cities in Kerman Province